Epepeotes luscus is a species of beetle in the family Cerambycidae. It was described by Johan Christian Fabricius in 1787. It is known from Malaysia, China, Indonesia, Cambodia, Myanmar, the Nicobar and Solomon Islands, Laos, Thailand, India, and Vietnam. It feeds on Mangifera indica.

Subspecies
 Epepeotes luscus densemaculatus Breuning, 1943
 Epepeotes luscus floresicus Breuning, 1974

Varietas
 Epepeotes luscus var. enganensis Gahan, 1907
 Epepeotes luscus var. flavomaculatus Aurivillius, 1924
 Epepeotes luscus var. fumosus Pascoe, 1866
 Epepeotes luscus var. interruptus Breuning, 1943
 Epepeotes luscus var. ochreosticticus Breuning, 1943
 Epepeotes luscus var. soembanicus Schwarzer, 1931

References

luscus
Beetles described in 1787